Woods 4: The Green Album is the third full-length album and fourth studio release by Ontario blackened doom metal band Woods of Ypres. It is the band's only release to feature guitarist Bryan Belleau, the only full album to feature Evan and Shane Madden on bass and drums, and the only full-length Woods of Ypres release to not feature frontman David Gold on drums. It is the band's only full-length album to be released on Gold's final independent label Practical Art Records, and its March 2011 reissue through Earache Records marked their debut on that label as well. A music video (the band's last) was released for the song "I Was Buried in Mount Pleasant Cemetery". A limited run of 1,000 copies of Woods IV also included a bonus album: Slaughter of the Seoul, the final album by South Korean death metal band Necramyth, who Gold drummed for at the time.

Track listing

Personnel

Woods of Ypres
David Gold - vocals, guitars, piano
Bryan Belleau - lead guitars
Shane Madden - bass
Evan Madden - drums

Additional personnel
Nathanael LaRochette - guitar on "You Are Here With Me (In This Sequence Of Dreams)"
Raphael Weinroth-Browne - cello on "You Are Here With Me (In This Sequence Of Dreams)"
Angela Schleihauf - oboe on "Shards of Love," "I Was Buried in Mount Pleasant Cemetery" and "You Are Here With Me (In This Sequence Of Dreams)"

Slaughter of the Seoul
Necramyth
Pedro "Urlok" Chae - vocals, guitar
Herlock - guitar
Johan - bass
David "Veillko" Gold - drums

Additional personnel
Hyo Jin - backing vocals on "Nymphonic Queen of Blood"
Hyoun Jeong Kim - backing vocals on "Nymphonic Queen of Blood"
Jae Ho - backing vocals on "Nymphonic Queen of Blood"

References

Sources 
 Woods 4: The Green Album

2009 albums
Woods of Ypres albums